Earl Cunningham may refer to:

 Earl Cunningham (folk artist)
 Earl Cunningham (USCG) the namesake of a Sentinel class cutter
 USCGC Earl Cunningham a Sentinel class cutter